85-15 Wareham Place is a house in the Jamaica Estates section of Queens, New York City. It is the childhood home of former U.S. President Donald Trump, and is the home listed on his birth certificate.  Trump lived here until age 4, when the family moved to a larger house adjacent to the property. It is located on Wareham Place near Henley Road.

The Tudor-style house, built in either the 1920s or in 1940 (sources differ) by Trump's father, Fred Trump, is located in the upper-middle-class neighborhood of Jamaica Estates. The house was put up for sale in July 2016, during the presidential campaign. It was scheduled to be sold at auction in October 2016, but the seller took it off the market. While it was initially listed at $1.65million, in December 2016, the house was purchased by Manhattan real estate investor Michael Davis for $1,390,500. Davis initially remained anonymous, and having never seen the house, arranged to have it sold at auction on January 17, 2017, three days before Trump's inauguration on January 20. According to the terms of the auction, the seller had five days to consider the bids. According to The New York Times, it was last auctioned for $2.14million to "a limited-liability company represented by a law firm that specializes in Chinese foreign investment" in March 2017.

In 2017, the house was listed on the house rental service Airbnb for $725 per night. After an attempt to sell it for $2.9million in February 2019, another auction was planned to conclude November 14, 2019. This failed as no qualified bids came forward.

References

Donald Trump
Presidential homes in the United States
Houses completed in 1940
Jamaica, Queens
Trump family residences
Houses in Queens, New York